Sámi Radio may refer to a Sami language radio station:

Scandinavia
 NRK Sápmi, a Public radio station in Norway
 Sameradion, a Public radio station in Sweden
 Yle Sámi Radio, a Public radio station in Finland